This is a collection of lists of mammal species by the estimated global population, divided by orders. Lists only exist for some orders; for example, the most diverse order - rodents - is missing. Much of the data in these lists were created by the International Union for Conservation of Nature (IUCN) Global Mammal Assessment Team, which consists of 1700 mammalogists from over 130 countries. They recognize 5488 species in the class.

These lists are not comprehensive, as not all mammals have had their numbers estimated. For example, a live specimen of the spade-toothed whale was first observed in December 2010, and the event only recognized as such in November 2012; no estimate yet exists for the global population. The accuracy of the quote numbers may only be an order of magnitude.

It is estimated that the total number of wild mammals in the world is about 130 billion.

Lists by taxonomic order
List of even-toed ungulates by populationbos species, bovidae artiodactyls, suiformes, camelidae species, cervidae artiodactyls, giraffa species, hippopotami.
List of cetacean species with population estimatesdolphins, porpoises, whales.
List of odd-toed ungulates by populationequines, rhinoceros, tapirs.
List of carnivorans by populationdomestic and wild feliformians and caniformians, pinnipeds, ursid species, musteloidea species, herpestidae species, etc.
List of felidaes by populationCats, Tigers and Lions.
List of bats by populationChiropterans.
List of primates by populationHominoideans (including humans and chimpanzees), lemurs, old world and new world primates.
List of elephant species by populationElephants.
List of marsupials by populationWombats, koalas and kangaroos.

See also

List of birds by population
Lists of organisms by population
World population (humans)

References

cap

 
Biology-related lists